William Craven may refer to:

William Craven (Lord Mayor of London) (died 1618), founder of Burnsall school
William Craven, 1st Earl of Craven (1608–1697), son of the Lord Mayor of London
William Craven, 2nd Baron Craven (1668–1711), English nobleman
William Craven, 3rd Baron Craven (1700–1739), English nobleman
William Craven, 5th Baron Craven (1705–1769), English nobleman
William Craven (Master of St John's College, Cambridge) (1730–1815)
William Craven, 6th Baron Craven (1738–1791), English nobleman
William Craven, 1st Earl of Craven (1770–1825) (the title having been re-created), British soldier
William Craven, 2nd Earl of Craven (1809–1866), British peer
William Craven, 4th Earl of Craven (1868–1921), British peer and Liberal politician
William Craven-Ellis (1880–1959), Member of UK Parliament for Southampton
William Craven, 5th Earl of Craven (1897–1932), British peer
William Craven, 6th Earl of Craven (1917–1965), British peer
William A. Craven, member of the California legislature

See also
William Craven, 1st Earl of Craven (disambiguation)
William Cravens (disambiguation)
Earl of Craven